Al Bouchie is a Canadian former professional darts player gamer who won the Quebec Open on January 21, 2007. Prior to it, he came in 16th place in both Canadian Open on June 17, 2006, and Windy City Open on September 25, 2005. After his Quebec win, he was qualified for the BDO World Darts Championship on November 15 of the same year and three days later participated at the World Masters Tournament.

References

Living people
Canadian darts players
Year of birth missing (living people)